Marcy Bloom (born 1954) is an American pro-choice activist known for serving for eighteen years as executive director of Aradia Women's Health Center in Seattle. Bloom was the 2006 recipient of the ACLU's highest honor, the William O. Douglas Award, for her work.

Bloom has described abortion as a "moral good", rather than a necessary evil. She writes a regular column for RH Reality Check, and is a leading fundraiser for reproductive rights organizations in Mexico. In addition to her work for abortion rights, Bloom is regarded as an expert on the biological aspects of sexual intercourse.

During the 2000 Democratic primary campaign, Senator Bill Bradley of New Jersey enlisted Bloom to tape radio ads critical of Al Gore's past flirtation with opposition to abortion.

Bloom is a board member of the Washington, D. C.-based National Abortion Rights Action League.

References

External links

We Already Have An Abortion Pride Movement

Living people
1954 births
Activists from Seattle
American feminists
American abortion-rights activists